Timugon Murut is a language spoken by the Murut people of Borneo.

References

Murutic languages
Languages of Malaysia